Polonyna is a specific, regionally-focused geographic term, that is used as a designation for areas of montane meadows (a landform type) in the upper subalpine or alpine zones of the Carpathian Mountains. The term polonyna was introduced to English from Slavic languages, in order to designate various mountainous regions, mainly in the Eastern Carpathians, and also in the Western Carpathians. The polonyna type areas of montane meadows are very frequent in the Outer Eastern Carpathians, particularly in the Eastern Beskids. Throughout history, they were used for pasture, and in modern times they have become a popular destination for various forms of recreational tourism.

The noun polonyna (plur. polonynas) and its corresponding adjectives (anglicized as polonyne or polonynian) are also used frequently in local toponyms throughout the Carpathian region. One of two main mountain ranges of the Eastern Beskids is known as the Polonyne Beskids or Polonynian Beskids, and it includes several mountains that also contain the same term in their names, like: Smooth Polonyna, Polonyna Borzhava, Red Polonyna, etc.

See also

References

Sources

Further reading
 Андрій Л. Байцар, "Полонини Українських Карпат" (Adriy L. Baytsar, Polonynas of the Ukrainian Carpathians), in: Генеза, географія та екологія ґрунтів: Збірник наукових праць Міжнародної конференції (Genesis, Geography and Ecology of Soils: Collection of Scientific Papers from the International Conference). Львів, 1999. - P. 107-109.
 Андрій Л. Байцар, "Полонини Українських Карпат: генезис, поширення та морфологія" (Adriy L. Baytsar, Polonynas of the Ukrainian Carpathians: Genesis, Distribution, and Morphology), Вісник Львівського університету: Серія географічна, 29 (2003) - P. 3-6.

External links

 Encyclopedia of Ukraine: Polonynian Beskyd
 Encyclopedia of Ukraine: Borzhava
 Encyclopedia of Ukraine: Krasna
 Encyclopedia of Ukraine: Svydivets
 Encyclopedia of Ukraine: Chornohora
 Encyclopedia of Ukraine: Skole Beskyd National Nature Park

Landforms
Eastern Carpathians